Presidente Carlos Ibáñez International Airport  is an airport serving the city of Punta Arenas in southern Chile in the Patagonia region of South America. The airport is shared with the Chilean Air Force. Its passenger terminal has three departure gates, two luggage belts, and 11 check-in counters.

Airlines and destinations

References

External links

  
  from AIP Chile
 Aeropuerto Pdte. Carlos Ibáñez del Campo (SCCI) 
 
 

Airports in Chile
Airports in Magallanes Region
Buildings and structures in Punta Arenas